A metal–air electrochemical cell is an electrochemical cell that uses an anode made from pure metal and an external cathode of ambient air, typically with an aqueous or aprotic electrolyte.

During discharging of a metal–air electrochemical cell, a reduction reaction occurs in the ambient air cathode while the metal anode is oxidized.

The specific capacity and energy density of metal–air electrochemical cells is higher than that of lithium-ion batteries, making them a prime candidate for use in electric vehicles. While there are some commercial applications, complications associated with the metal anodes, catalysts, and electrolytes have hindered development and implementation of metal–air batteries.

Types by anode element

Lithium 

The remarkably high energy density of lithium metal (up to 3458 Wh/kg) inspired the design of lithium–air batteries. A lithium–air battery consists of a solid lithium electrode, an electrolyte surrounding this electrode, and an ambient air electrode containing oxygen. Current lithium–air batteries can be divided into four subcategories based on the electrolyte used and the subsequent electrochemical cell architecture. These electrolyte categories are aprotic, aqueous, mixed aqueous/aprotic, and solid state, all of which offer their own distinct advantages and disadvantages. Nonetheless, efficiency of lithium–air batteries is still limited by incomplete discharge at the cathode, charging overpotential exceeding discharge overpotential, and component stability. During discharge of lithium–air batteries, the superoxide ion (O) formed will react with the electrolyte or other cell components and will prevent the battery from being rechargeable.

Sodium 

Sodium–air batteries were proposed with the hopes of overcoming the battery instability associated with superoxide in lithium–air batteries. Sodium, with an energy density of 1605 Wh/kg, does not boast as high an energy density as lithium. However, it can form a stable superoxide (NaO) as opposed to the superoxide undergoing detrimental secondary reactions. Since NaO will decompose reversibly to an extent back to the elemental components, this means sodium–air batteries have some intrinsic capacity to be rechargeable. Sodium–air batteries can only function with aprotic, anhydrous electrolytes. When a DMSO electrolyte was stabilized with sodium trifluoromethanesulfonimide, the highest cycling stability of a sodium–air battery was obtained (150 cycles).

Potassium 

Potassium–air batteries were also proposed with the hopes of overcoming the battery instability associated with superoxide in lithium–air batteries. While only two to three charge-discharge cycles have ever been achieved with potassium–air batteries, they do offer an exceptionally low overpotential difference of only 50 mV.

Zinc 

Zinc–air batteries are used for hearing aids and film cameras.

Magnesium 

A variety of metal-air chemistries are currently being studied. The homogeneous deposition of Mg metal makes Mg-air systems interesting. However, aqueous Mg-air batteries are seriously limited by the Mg electrode's dissolution. The use of a number of ionic aqueous electrolytes in magnesium-air devices has been recommended. Nevertheless, electrochemical fragility affects them all. However, the cell's reversibility is limited, and the especially visible during recharging.

Calcium 

Calcium–air(O2) batteries have been reported.

Aluminium 
Aluminium-air batteries have the highest energy density of any other battery, with a theoretical maximum energy density of 6-8 KWh/Kg, however, a maximum of only 1.3 KWh/Kg has been achieved. Aluminium battery cells are not rechargeable, so new aluminium anodes must be installed to continue getting power from the battery, which makes them expensive to use and limited to mostly military applications.  

Aluminium-air batteries have been used for prototypes of electric cars, with one claiming 2000 km of range on a single charge, however none have been available to the public. However, Aluminium-air batteries maintain a stable voltage and power output until they run out of power, which could make them useful for electric planes, where full power is always required in case of emergency landings. Due to not having to carry a separate metal anode, the natural low density of aluminium, and the high energy density of aluminium-air batteries, the batteries are very lightweight, which is also beneficial for electric aviation. The scale of airports could also allow for on-site recycling of anodes, which would not be feasible for cars where many small stations are necessary.  

Aluminium-air batteries are better for the environment compared to traditional lithium-ion batteries. Aluminium is the most abundant metal in the Earth's crust, so mines would not have to be as invasive to find a similar amount of aluminium compared to lithium. Another factor is that aluminium recycling plants already exist, while lithium recycling plants are just starting to emerge and become profitable. Aluminium is a lot more economical to recycle with current technology.

Iron 

Iron–air rechargeable batteries are an attractive technology with the potential of grid-scale energy storage. The main raw-material of this technology is iron oxide (rust) which is abundant, non-toxic, inexpensive, and environmentally friendly. Most of the batteries currently being developed utilize iron oxide powders to generate and store hydrogen via the Fe/FeO reduction/oxidation (redox) reaction (Fe + H2O  FeO + H2). In conjunction with a fuel cell, this enables the system to behave as a rechargeable battery, creating H2O/H2 via the production and consumption of electricity. Furthermore, this technology has minimal environmental impact, as it could be used to store energy from intermittent solar and wind power sources, developing an energy system with low carbon dioxide emissions.

One way the system can start is by using the Fe/FeO redox reaction. Hydrogen created during the oxidation of iron and of oxygen from the air can be consumed by a fuel cell to create electricity. When electricity must be stored, hydrogen generated from water by operating the fuel cell in reverse is consumed during the reduction of the iron oxide to metallic iron. The combination of both of these cycles is what makes the system operate as an iron–air rechargeable battery.

Limitations of this technology come from the materials used. Generally, iron oxide powder beds are selected; however, rapid sintering and pulverization of the powders limit the ability to achieve a high number of cycles, which results in diminished capacity. Other methods currently under investigation, such as 3D printing and freeze-casting, seek to enable the creation of architecture materials to allow for high surface area and volume changes during the redox reaction.

Comparison

See also 

 Lithium–sulfur battery
 Silicon–air battery

Notes

References

External links 

 High-temperature metal–air battery

Battery types